An identical note is a term used in diplomacy to denote terms agreed upon by two powers to coerce a third.

See also
Stimson Doctrine

External links
 Mention  of the term related to a circular diplomatic note.
 The Pentagon Papers
 Mention of an identical note sent by U.S. President Theodore Roosevelt
 An identical note from the Yamen.

Diplomacy